The 1936 Major League Baseball season was contested from April 14 to October 6, 1936. The New York Giants and New York Yankees were the regular season champions of the National League and American League, respectively. The Yankees then defeated the Giants in the World Series, four games to two.

The Boston Braves changed their nickname to "Bees" this season; they would revert to the Braves in 1941.

Awards and honors
Baseball Hall of Fame
Ty Cobb
Babe Ruth
Honus Wagner
Christy Mathewson
Walter Johnson
Most Valuable Player
American League: Lou Gehrig, New York Yankees, 1B
National League: Carl Hubbell, New York Giants, P
The Sporting News Player of the Year Award
Carl Hubbell, New York Giants, P
The Sporting News Manager of the Year Award
Joe McCarthy, New York Yankees

Statistical leaders

Standings

American League

National League

Postseason

Bracket

Managers

American League

National League

Feats
The New York Yankees set a Major League record for the most runs batted in during a season, with 995.

Home Field Attendance

Events
 July 16 – The Cincinnati Reds – Brooklyn Dodgers game is cancelled due to extreme heat.
 July 30 – The Boston Red Sox are the first Major League team to travel by aircraft to an away game, when they travel from St. Louis to play Chicago.

References

External links
1936 Major League Baseball season schedule at Baseball Reference

 
Major League Baseball seasons